Q'illu Urqu (Quechua q'illu yellow, urqu mountain, "yellow mountain", also spelled Khellu Orkho) is a  mountain in the Andes of Bolivia. It is situated in the Potosí Department, Sud Lípez Province, San Pablo de Lípez Municipality. Q'illu Urqu lies south-west of the mountain Ch'aska Urqu and north-east of the mountain Palti Urqu. The river Qaqa Pallqa flows along its western slope.

References 

Mountains of Potosí Department